Magura-2 is a constituency represented in the Jatiya Sangsad (National Parliament) of Bangladesh since 2008 by Biren Sikder of the Awami League.

Boundaries 
The constituency encompasses Mohammadpur and Shalikha upazilas, and four union parishads of Magura Sadar Upazila: Birail Palita, Gopalgram, Kuchiamora, and Satrujitpur.

History 
The constituency was created in 1984 from the Jessore-11 constituency when the former Jessore District was split into four districts: Jhenaidah, Jessore, Magura, and Narail.

Members of Parliament

Elections

Elections in the 2010s

Elections in the 2000s

Elections in the 1990s 

Mohammad Asaduzzaman died in office. Quazi Kamal of the BNP was elected in a March 1994 by-election.

References

External links
 

Parliamentary constituencies in Bangladesh
Magura District